Chaceon quinquedens, commonly known as the red deep-sea crab, but sold as Atlantic deep sea red crab, or simply Atlantic red crab or red crab is a crab that lives in the Atlantic Ocean off the East Coast of the United States and Canada, from North Carolina to Nova Scotia.

The crab is commercially fished as food. Since 2002, the species has been managed under the Atlantic Deep-Sea Red Crab Fishery Management Plan created by the New England Fishery Management council. The National Marine Fisheries Service has established an Acceptable Biological Catch (ABC) of 1,775 tons (3.91 million pounds) but average landings rarely exceed 930 tons (2.05 Million lbs) and average value of landings in 2016-2018 was $3.29 Million. The species resembles a snow crab from Alaska. However, they are actually  members of the superfamily Portunoidea, or swimming crabs, so are more closely related to blue crabs Callinectes sapidus, although they do not have the flattened fifth leg characteristic of that species. According to the Virginia Marine Products Board, the average weight of marketed crabs is about one to two pounds, and the average size is "1-2 lbs. or 5 to 7 inches (12.5cm-17.5cm) across the back of the shell."

Red deep sea crab on the US east coast show distinct sex segregation by depth along the continental slope. Females predominate in depths of 450–700 m, and those in shallow water are predominantly reproductive adults, whereas males predominate at greater depths. Furthermore, crabs in deeper water tend to be smaller than those in shallow water. This distribution suggests that red deep sea crabs undergo ontogenetic (life-cycle) migration.  In this scenario, females on the upper slope (above 600 m) release larvae that migrate to surface waters, then settle in water deeper than 1000 m.  As they grow, they move upslope and eventually become mature in shallower water. Red deep sea crabs living in the Gulf of Mexico, however, do not demonstrate a similar distribution; both large and small crabs are found from 500 to 1950 m, and no relationship with depth was found for sex or size. 

Red deep-sea crabs can develop a shell disease. This disease looks like small or large black and grey spots on the shell. These are caused by bacteria and fungi that are contagious to other crustaceans.

References

Further reading
Essential Fish Habitat Source Document: Red Deepsea Crab, Chaceon (Geryon) quinquedens, NOAA Technical Memorandum NMFS-NE-163, National Oceanic and Atmospheric Administration, National Marine Fisheries Service Northeast Region, Northeast Fisheries Science Center (January 2001)

Crabs of the Atlantic Ocean
Portunoidea
Crustaceans described in 1879